Brandon Wardell may refer to:

 Brandon Wardell (actor) (born 1975), American actor, producer and musician
 Brandon Wardell (comedian) (born 1992), American comedian

See also
 Brandon Waddell (born 1994), American baseball player